The Lenne is a tributary of the river Ruhr in North Rhine-Westphalia, Germany.

Lenne may also refer to:

Places in Germany 
 Lenne (Weser), a tributary of the Weser in Lower Saxony
 Lenne (Schmallenberg), a locality in Schmallenberg, North Rhine-Westphalia
 Lenne, Lower Saxony, a municipality in the district of Holzminden, Lower Saxony
 Lenne Mountains, a range of hills in North Rhine-Westphalia

People

Given name 
 Lenne Hardt, American voice actress and ring announcer for Japanese MMA organizations

Surname 
Bert Lenne (1889–1973), Australian footballer
George Lenne (1916–2014), Australian rules footballer
Marion Lenne, French politician
Peter Joseph Lenné (1789-1866), German landscape architect
Yanis Lenne (born 1996), French handball player

Other 
Lenne (Final Fantasy X-2), a character in the video game Final Fantasy X-2, voiced by Cree Summer